is a regional radio and television broadcaster headquartered in Kumamoto, Kumamoto, Japan that serves Kumamoto Prefecture. 

RKK was founded in 1953, commenced radio broadcast in October 1953, and television in April 1959.  RKK is affiliated with the JNN (TV), JRN and NRN (radio). It is the only commercial broadcasting that provides both TV and radio services in Kumamoto prefecture.  

On December 1, 2006, RKK started broadcasting digital terrestrial television.

References

External links
Official site 

Japan News Network
Television stations in Japan
Television channels and stations established in 1959
1959 establishments in Japan